The Pritzker Literature Award for Lifetime Achievement in Military Writing (formerly Pritzker Military Library Literature Award 2007-2013) is a literary award given annually by the Pritzker Military Museum & Library. First awarded in 2007, it is a lifetime achievement award for military writing, sponsored by the Tawani Foundation of Chicago. The prize is valued at $100,000, making it one of the richest literary prizes in the world.

Honorees

References

External links
The Pritzker Literature Award for Lifetime Achievement in Military Writing, official website.
2010 Award Ceremony, video broadcast on C-SPAN (01:30:00), Oct. 21. 2010
 Discussion by two previous Pritzker Military Library Literature Award for Lifetime Achievement award winners, Rick Atkinson and Sir Max Hastings, on Sunday, February 3, 2013

Awards established in 2007
Military literary awards
American literary awards
Literary awards honoring lifetime achievement